Rives Air Park (formerly T33) is a public airport located nine miles (14.5 km) south of the central business district (CBD) of Royse City, in Rockwall County, Texas, United States.

The airport is used solely for general aviation purposes.

Facilities 
Rives Air Park has one runway:
 Runway 4/22: 2,800 x 40 ft. (853 x 12 m), Surface: Asphalt

External links 

Airports in Texas
Airports in the Dallas–Fort Worth metroplex
Transportation in Rockwall County, Texas